Ümran Zambak (born 27 November 2000) is a Dutch professional footballer who plays as a forward for SV Schermbeck. He has also Turkish nationality.

Professional career
On 3 September 2019, Zambak signed his first professional contract with Kayserispor. He signed for five years. In his professional debut game in a Turkish Cup tie against Bayrampaşa he scored the 1-0. Zambak made his Süper Lig debut for Kayserispor in a 6-2 loss to Trabzonspor on 28 December 2019.

References

External links
 
 

2000 births
Living people
Sportspeople from Almelo
Dutch footballers
Dutch people of Turkish descent
Kayserispor footballers
Süper Lig players
Association football midfielders
HVV Tubantia players
Footballers from Overijssel
Dutch expatriate footballers
Dutch expatriate sportspeople in Turkey
Expatriate footballers in Turkey
Expatriate footballers in Germany
Dutch expatriate sportspeople in Germany
Brandenburger SC Süd 05 players